Transmitter Nowa Karczma is a facility for FM- and TV-transmission at Nowa Karczma, Poland at . It uses as antenna tower a  guyed mast.

Transmitted Programmes

External links
 http://emi.emitel.pl/EMITEL/obiekty.aspx?obiekt=DODR_W2H
http://radiopolska.pl/wykaz/pokaz_lokalizacja.php?pid=137

See also
List of masts

Towers in Poland
Lubań County
Buildings and structures in Lower Silesian Voivodeship